Sophia Atherley "Sofie" Allsopp (born 1980) is a British television presenter.

Early life
Her parents are Charles Allsopp, 6th Baron Hindlip (born 1940), and Fiona Victoria Jean Atherley (née McGowan, 1947–2014). Sofie has two sisters, television presenter Kirstie Allsopp (born 1971) and Natasha (born 1986); and a brother, Henry (born 1973).

Designer and businesswoman Cath Kidston is her cousin.

Career
Sofie has worked as a real-estate agent, a sales and letting negotiator and a relocation agent in Notting Hill, London. She had her own company, specialising in finding houses, managing moves and providing aftercare services to new home-owners.
In 2006, she temporarily replaced her sister Kirstie as co-presenter of Location, Location, Location, while Kirstie was on maternity leave. During this period, she presented an episode in which Hackney was voted as the worst place to live in the UK, which caused some controversy.

In 2008, she began hosting the Canadian television show The Unsellables on HGTV (Canada). Her role on the show was to help people sell their "unsellable" homes. The programme has since been broadcast on the U.S. HGTV and on the BBC in the UK, where Sofie is paired with property expert John Rennie.

Personal life
She has a degree in Medieval History from the University of Edinburgh.

Filmography

References

External links

Location, Location, Location: Best and Worst LIVE - Interview with Phil Spencer - My Park Magazine
I'm Hackneyed, and happy in my slum - The Observer

1980 births
Living people
Date of birth missing (living people)
Daughters of barons
English television presenters
British estate agents (people)